Scandal at the Embassy is a 1950 West German comedy film directed by Erik Ode and starring Viktor de Kowa, Jeanette Schultze and Michiko Tanaka.

It was shot at the Bavaria Studios in Munich. The film's sets were designed by the art director Willi Herrmann and Heinrich Weidemann.

Cast
 Viktor de Kowa as Fred Corvin & Dr. Tamanyo
 Jeanette Schultze as Fanny
 Michiko Tanaka as Nina, die Botschafterin
 Andrews Engelmann as Der Botschafter
 Ernst Waldow as Ministerialrat
 Johannes von Hamme as Exzellenz
 Fritz Odemar as Gefängnisdirektor
 Fritz Rasp as Inspector Kick
 Rita Paul
 Rudolf Carl as Gefängnisbeamter
 Gunther Philipp
 Walter Janssen
 Mady Rahl as Rita
 Udo Loeptin
 Erik Ode
 Walter Hillbring
 Ulrich Beiger
 Marianne Pastré as Tänzerin
 Maria Zach
 Ulrich Folkmar
 Karl-Heinz Peters
 Ernst Rotmund

References

Bibliography 
 Hans-Michael Bock and Tim Bergfelder. The Concise Cinegraph: An Encyclopedia of German Cinema. Berghahn Books, 2009.

External links 
 

1950 films
1950 comedy films
German comedy films
West German films
1950s German-language films
Films directed by Erik Ode
Films shot at Bavaria Studios
German films based on plays
German black-and-white films
1950s German films